The 7th Cavalry Division (7-ya Kavaleriiskaya Diviziya) was a cavalry formation of the Russian Imperial Army.

Organization
 1st Cavalry Brigade
 Kinbourne 7th Regiment of Dragoons
 Olviopol 7th Alfonso the XIII King of Spain's Own Uhlan Regiment
 2nd Cavalry Brigade
 Belorussian 7th Regiment of Hussars
 11th graf Denisov's Regiment of Don Cossacks
 7th Horse Artillery Division

Great War
On June 15, 1915 the entire Division under the supreme command of Lt.–General Theodore von Rohrberg finally managed to stop the advance of German forces under August von Mackensen by means of breaking in between the Germans' first and second lines and completely destroying all the means of communication and artillery support, including tens of heavy artillery pieces and machine-guns, suffering just 200 casualties. As a result, Russians were able to start the Great Retreat of 1915 without experiencing instant German pressure.

Headquarters
 Kovel — 1903–1909
 Volodymyr-Volynskyi — 1913–1914

Commanders (Division Chiefs)
 1905: Leonid Fomin
 1907–1912: Mikhail Mikhailovich Pleshkov
 1914–1917: Theodore von Rohrberg

References

Cavalry divisions of the Russian Empire
Military units and formations disestablished in 1918